P2Y purinoceptor 4 is a protein that in humans is encoded by the P2RY4 gene.

The product of this gene, P2Y4, belongs to the family of G-protein coupled receptors. This family has several receptor subtypes with different pharmacological selectivity, which overlaps in some cases, for various adenosine and uridine nucleotides. This receptor is responsive to uridine nucleotides, partially responsive to ATP, and not responsive to ADP.

See also
 P2Y receptor

References

Further reading

External links

G protein-coupled receptors